Bob's your uncle is an expression generally meaning "and there you have it."

Bob's your uncle or Bob's yer uncle may also refer to:

Film and television
 Bob's Your Uncle (film), a 1942 British film
 Bob's Your Uncle, ITV game show from 1990s

Music
 Bob's Yer Uncle (band), an alternative rock band in Chicago, IL USA
 Bob's Your Uncle (band), a late-1980s alternative rock group in Canada
 "Bob's Yer Uncle", a song by the band Happy Mondays from their album Pills 'n' Thrills and Bellyaches

Other
 Bob's Your Uncle (play), a 1948 British musical comedy 
 Bob's Your Uncle (YouTuber), a Hong Kong YouTuber who makes videos about cooking and travelling